Račić is a Serbo-Croatian family name.

Račići are mostly of Croatian ethnicity – in Croatia, about 800 persons in 250 households bear this name – and only rarely Serbs (from the Banja Luka area, BiH) or Bosniaks (from Cazin, BiH). 

Notable people with this name include:

 Aleksandra Račić (born 1990), Serbian basketball player
 Dragoslav Račić (1905–1945), Serbian military commander
 Jakša Račić (1868–1943), Yugoslav National Party politician
 Josip Račić (1885–1908), Croatian painter
 Krešo Račić (1932–1994), Croatian hammer thrower
 Marko Račič (born 1920), Slovenian track and field athlete
 Puniša Račić (1886–1944), Montenegrin Serb Chetnik leader
 Stevan Račić (born 1984), Serbian footballer
 Uroš Račić (born 1998), Serbian footballer

See also 
 Račić and Račići, two villages in Bosnia and Herzegovina bearing the same name (singular and plural)
 Racić (surname)

References 

Croatian surnames
Serbian surnames